Michel Paul Bernheim (17 January 1908, in Paris – 20 April 1985 in Paris) was a French cinematographer and film director

Filmography 
Cinematographer :
 1927: The Crystal Submarine by Marcel Vandal
 1928: Nile Water by Marcel Vandal
Assistant-director :
 1929: La Vie miraculeuse de Thérèse Martin by Julien Duvivier
 1929: La Divine Croisière by Julien Duvivier
 1931: Coquecigrole by André Berthomieu 
 1932: Azaïs by René Hervil
Director : 
 1932: 
 1935: Marie des angoisses
 1936: Le roman d'un spahi
 1937:  (codirector : Christian Chamborant)
 1938: 
 1953: Le gouffre de la Pierre Saint-Martin (short documentary)

External links 
 

French cinematographers
Film directors from Paris
1908 births
1985 deaths